Prince Kofi Amoabeng (born February 22, 1952) is a Ghanaian businessman and a former military officer of the Ghanaian Armed Forces. He was a co-founder of UT Bank which collapsed in 2017 during Ghana's banking crisis amid allegations that he had misappropriated funds from the bank.  He is currently subject to ongoing court battles regarding these allegations following his arrest on 14 January 2020, and release on bail of 110 million cedis.

Early life 
Amoabeng was born on 22 February 1952 in Bososo in the Eastern Region of Ghana.

Education 
Amoabeng started his schooling at Penworth Preparatory School, a boarding school in Accra. He had his secondary education at the St Peter's Secondary School at Nkwatia Kwahu and Adisadel College in Cape Coast Ghana before proceeding to the University of Ghana for his undergraduate degree. He received a Bachelor of Science degree in administration in 1975 with 2nd-class upper honours from the University of Ghana Business School. After joining the military, he won a scholarship from the Ministry of Defence to pursue a course at the Royal Army Pay Corps, where he qualified as an accountant within 18 months and decided to return home upon graduation.

Career 
Amoabeng began his career in the Ghana Armed Forces in April, 1975. He was commissioned as a lieutenant in November 1975.

Awards and recognition 
 Lifetime Achievement for Innovation in Africa, 2013
 Johnnie Walker Giant, 2012. A global "Walk With Giants" campaign.
 Overall Best Entrepreneur in the Maiden Ghana Entrepreneurs Award (2011)
 One of two Ghanaians profiled in Moky Makura's book on Africa's Greatest Entrepreneurs which profiles 16 of Africa's top entrepreneurs.
 Ghana's Most Respected CEO for 2008/2010/2012.
 National Honours for an Order of the Star of the Volta- Officer's Division presented by thenPresident of Ghana in 2008.
 (CIMG)  Marketing Man of the Year 2006

Controversies and allegations 
In January 2020, Amoabeng was charged with the embezzlement of a total amount of 59.9 million Ghana cedis from UT Bank, having been a cofounder of the bank which collapsed during the Ghana banking crisis. The original charges were subsequently dropped and the prosecution intends to bring other charges.

References 

Ghanaian businesspeople
Alumni of Adisadel College
Living people
1952 births